The World Series of Boxing or WSB was an international boxing tournament that allowed amateur boxers to compete professionally while maintaining amateur status and Olympic eligibility. It was organized by AIBA from 2010 to 2018. AIBA confirmed in 2019 that the league had ceased operations amid mounting financial losses.

History
The World Series of Boxing had a precursor in the International Boxing League, a short-lived U.S. venture established in November 1969 after the first U.S.—Soviet boxing dual meet in 1969. The league functioned until 1971 and hosted several exhibition tours of the Soviet boxing team across the United States to cities where IBL teams were located. Bill Daniels was the boss of the league. The league folded due to the unprofitable nature of amateur boxing in North America.

Format
Unlike in amateur boxing at the start of the World Series of Boxing's existence, competitors fought bare-chested and were not permitted to wear protective headgear. Each participating boxer was drafted by one of its international franchises, and could earn money by taking part in professional-style bouts. The competitors were allowed to maintain Olympic and AIBA world championship eligibility. 

Like professional boxing, each bout was decided by the scores of three judges, or by a knockout, a technical knockout or a walkover. A WSB meet between two international franchises consisted of bouts in ten (formerly five) weight categories. The fights consisted of five three-minute rounds in each bout and the team that won the most number of bouts won the meet.

Weight classes
Until season 4, the World Series of Boxing had five weight categories which were different from the 10 categories in amateur (Olympic) boxing or 17 categories in professional boxing. These were Heavyweight (91+ kg), Light heavyweight (80–85 kg), Middleweight (68–73 kg), Lightweight (57–61 kg) and Bantamweight (50–54 kg). In the fourth season (2013–14), the number of weight classes was increased to ten, mirroring amateur (Olympic) boxing.

 Light flyweight (46–49 kg)
 Flyweight (-52 kg)
 Bantamweight (-56 kg)
 Lightweight (-60 kg)
 Light welterweight (-64 kg)
 Welterweight (-69 kg)
 Middleweight (-75 kg)
 Light heavyweight (-81 kg)
 Heavyweight (-91 kg)
 Super heavyweight (91+ kg)

Teams

  Algeria Desert Hawks
  Argentina Condors
  Astana Arlans
  Atlas Lions
  Baku Fires
  British Lionhearts
  Caciques de Venezuela
  China Dragons
  Heroicos de Colombia
  Cuba Domadores
  D&G Milano Thunder
  Dynamo Moscow
  German Eagles
  Hussars Poland
  Mexico Guerreros
  Morocco Atlas Lions
  Paris United
  Puerto Rico Hurricanes
  Russian Boxing Team
  Türkiye Conquerors
  Ukraine Otamans
  USA Knockouts
  Uzbek Tigers

Results

Performance by club

See also
Boxing World Cup

References

External links
Official site of World Series Boxing (WSB)

 
World championships in boxing
Amateur boxing